Ortelli is a surname and may refer to:

Arnaldo Ortelli, Swiss footballer
Guillermo Ortelli (born 1973), Argentine racing car driver
Stéphane Ortelli (born 1970), Monegasque racing driver
Toni Ortelli (1904–2000), Italian alpinist, conductor and composer
Vito Ortelli (1921–2017), Italian racing cyclist

See also
Orotelli
Sportelli
Tortelli